The 2000 United States Senate election in Maryland was held on November 7, 2000. Incumbent Democratic U.S. Senator Paul Sarbanes won re-election to a fifth term.

Candidates

Democratic 
 Paul Sarbanes, incumbent U.S. Senator first elected in 1976

Republican 
 Paul H. Rappaport, former Howard County police chief and nominee for Lieutenant Governor in 1994

Campaign 
Rappaport won the Republican primary against S. Rob Sobhani, Ross Zimmerman Pierpont, Robin Ficker, Kenneth R. Timmerman, Kenneth Wayman and John Stafford through a grassroots movement with a plurality of just 23%. Rappaport, a major underdog, pushed for three debates. The four-term incumbent agreed to one debate on October 26.

Results

Results by county

Counties that flipped from Republican to Democrat
Anne Arundel

Counties that flipped from Democrat to Republican
Harford

See also
2000 United States Senate elections
2000 United States elections

References

Notes

2000
Maryland
United States Senate